Viacom18 is an Indian company founded in 2007 by joint venture operation between TV18 and Paramount Global based in Mumbai.

Viacom18 may also refer to:

Viacom18 Studios, an Indian Film Studio founded in 2006 Studio 18
Colors TV, an Indian TV Channel

Colors brand Channels 
 Colors TV, an Indian TV Channel

 Colors Rishtey, an Indian Life Channel

 Colors Cineplex, an Indian Movie Channel

 Colors Infinity, an Indian TV Channel

 Colors Bangla, an Indian TV Channel

 Colors Bangla Cinema, an Indian TV Movie Channel

 Colors Gujarati, an Indian TV Channel

 Colors Gujarati Cinema, an Indian TV Movie Channel

 Colors Kannada, an Indian TV Channel

 Colors Super, an Indian TV Channel

 Colors Kannada Cinema, an Indian TV Channel

 Colors Marathi, an Indian TV Channel

 Colors Odia, an Indian TV Channel

 Colors Tamil, an Indian TV Channel

ViacomCBS 

 MTV, and Indian Music Channel

 MTV Beats, Indian Music Channel

 VH1, an Indian Movie Channel

 Nickelodeon, an Indian Children Channel

 Nickelodeon Sonic, Indian TV Channel that is not to be confused with Sonic Team

 Nick Jr., Indian TV Channel with Nick Jr.

 Nick HD+, an Indian TV Channel HD

 Comedy Central, Indian Comedy Channel

Digital 
 Voot, an streaming corporation

See also 
 Viacom18
 Viacom (disambiguation)